Kochuveli–Yesvantpur AC SF Express, train numbers 22677/22678, is a fully air conditioned passenger train service between  (Trivandrum) and  stations.

Stops

Schedule

Coaches
The Kochuveli–Yesvantpur AC Express has 1 AC first class, 1 AC 2 tier, 16 AC 3 tier & 2 end on generator coaches. In addition, it carries a pantry car coach.

Rake sharing

12213/12214 – Yeshvantapur–Delhi Sarai Rohilla AC Duronto Express

References

Transport in Bangalore
Transport in Thiruvananthapuram
Railway services introduced in 2013
AC Express (Indian Railways) trains
Rail transport in Karnataka
Rail transport in Tamil Nadu
Rail transport in Kerala